Santhi is a 1965 Indian Tamil-language film, directed by A. Bhimsingh and produced by A. L. Srinivasan. The film stars Sivaji Ganesan, S. S. Rajendran, C. R. Vijayakumari and Devika. It was released on 22 April 1965. The film was remade in Hindi as Gauri (1968).

Plot

Cast 
Sivaji Ganesan as Santhanam
S. S. Rajendran as Ramu
M. R. Radha as Paramasivam Pillai
Nagesh as Paramanandam
Nagayya as Kailasam Pillai
S. V. Sahasranamam as Doctor
R. Vijayakumari as Santhi
Devika as Malliga
N. R. Sandhya as Santhanam's mother
K. Manorama as Sundari
Tambaram Lalitha as Nagamma

Production 
Santhi marked the final time Sivaji Ganesan and M. R. Radha appeared together onscreen.

Soundtrack 
Soundtrack was composed by Viswanathan–Ramamoorthy, with lyrics by Kannadasan. According to T. M. Soundararajan, when Viswanathan sang to him the tune of "Yaarantha Nilavu" that Soundararajan was supposed to sing, he was dumbstruck: "I was just too stunned and I wondered how I am going to sing it. It is impossible to sing like him". Ganesan who heard the song decided to postpone the shoot of this song as he wanted to prepare himself for performing in order to suit Soundarajan's style of rendition for this song.

Release and reception 
Santhi was originally scheduled for release on 10 April 1965, but was instead released 12 days later because the Censor Board originally wanted to give the film an "A" (adults only) certificate. The makers of the film thought this would prevent people from bringing their families to the theatres and it took some time for them to get the film a "U" (universal) certificate. The film was distributed by Sivaji Films. Kalki appreciated the film for the cast performances.

References

External links 
 

1960s Tamil-language films
1965 drama films
1965 films
Films directed by A. Bhimsingh
Films scored by Viswanathan–Ramamoorthy
Indian drama films
Tamil films remade in other languages